Rai Cultura is the cultural division of RAI:
The former channels are:
Rai 5, an Italian television channel
Rai Scuola, an Italian television channel 
Rai Storia, an Italian television channel